Saffar Island is the rocky island off the north coast of Elephant Island in the South Shetland Islands, Antarctica extending 290 m in west–east direction and 230 m in south–north direction, with a surface area of 3.64 ha. It is separated from Elephant Island by a passage narrowing to 325 m at points.

The feature is named after Ibn al-Saffar (d. 1035), an Al-Andalusian astronomer and author of one of the Arabic treatises on the astrolabe that introduced the triangulation method to Europe; in association with other names in the area deriving from the early development or use of geodetic instruments and methods.

Location
British mapping of the area in 1822,1972 and 2009.

See also
 List of Antarctic and subantarctic islands

Maps
 Chart of South Shetland including Coronation Island, &c. from the exploration of the sloop Dove in the years 1821 and 1822 by George Powell Commander of the same. Scale ca. 1:200000. London: Laurie, 1822.
 Elephant Island: From a survey by the Joint Services Expedition, December 1970. Scale 1:132000 topographic map. Royal Geographical Society (UK), 1972.
 British Antarctic Territory. Scale 1:200000 topographic map. DOS 610 Series, Sheet W 61 54. Directorate of Overseas Surveys, Tolworth, UK, 1972.
 South Shetland Islands: Elephant, Clarence and Gibbs Islands. Scale 1:220000 topographic map. UK Antarctic Place-names Committee, 2009.
 Antarctic Digital Database (ADD). Scale 1:250000 topographic map of Antarctica. Scientific Committee on Antarctic Research (SCAR). Since 1993, regularly upgraded and updated.

Notes

References
 Bulgarian Antarctic Gazetteer. Antarctic Place-names Commission. (details in Bulgarian, basic data in English)

External links
 Saffar Island. Adjusted Copernix satellite image

Islands of the South Shetland Islands
Elephant Island
Bulgaria and the Antarctic